Oskar Jellvik is a Swedish ice hockey centre who plays for Djurgårdens IF J20 of J20 Nationell.  He made his SHL debut for Djurgårdens IF during the 2020–21 season. Jellvik was drafted by the Boston Bruins in the fifth round of the 2021 NHL Entry Draft with the 149th pick in the draft.

References

External links
 

2003 births
Living people
Swedish ice hockey centres
Djurgårdens IF Hockey players
Boston Bruins draft picks
People from Täby Municipality
Sportspeople from Stockholm County